Patrick Kaufusi (born 18 February 1994) is a Tonga international rugby league footballer who plays as a  for the Townsville Blackhawks in the Intrust Super Cup. 

He previously played for the North Queensland Cowboys, Melbourne Storm and the St George Illawarra Dragons in the NRL.

Background
Kaufusi was born in Auckland, New Zealand, and is of Tongan and Niuean descent. He moved to Australia at a young age and was educated at Shalom Catholic College, Bundaberg.

Patrick played his junior rugby league for the Bundaberg Brothers, before being signed by the North Queensland Cowboys.

Early career

From 2012 to 2014, Kaufusi played for the North Queensland Cowboys' NYC team. On 20 April 2013, he played for the Queensland Under-20s team against the New South Wales Under-20s team. On 3 October 2013, he re-signed with the Cowboys on a 3-year contract. In September 2014, Kaufusi was named in the Junior Kangaroos train-on squad. 

In 2015, he moved on to the Cowboys' Queensland Cup team, Northern Pride RLFC.

Playing career

2015
In Round 16 of the 2015 NRL season, Kaufusi made his NRL debut for the Cowboys against the Cronulla-Sutherland Sharks.

2016
In Round 7 of the 2016 NRL season, Kaufusi played his second NRL game, coming off the bench in the Cowboys' 44-18 win over the South Sydney Rabbitohs. On 7 May, he made his international debut for Tonga against Samoa in the 2016 Polynesian Cup.

Kaufusi played 12 games for the Cowboys in 2016, coming off the interchange bench in all 12.

2017
Kaufusi started the 2017 NRL season coming off the bench for the Cowboys. After starting prop and co-captain Matthew Scott tore his anterior cruciate ligament (ACL) in Round 2, Kaufusi moved into the starting line-up for the first time. In Round 3, he started his first NRL game, a 30-8 loss to the Manly Sea Eagles. On 6 May, he represented Tonga in the 2017 Pacific Test against Fiji. He broke his foot in the fixture, which ruled him out for the rest of the season.

On 1 September, Melbourne Storm head coach Craig Bellamy confirmed that Kaufusi would join the club in 2018.

2018
In Round 16 of the 2018 NRL season, Kaufusi made his Melbourne Storm debut against the Sydney Roosters at Adelaide Oval. Patrick became the third Kaufusi to play for the Melbourne Storm, after his brothers Antonio and Felise.

2019
Kaufusi made a total of 6 appearances for St George in the 2019 NRL season as the club finished second last on the table.
In November 2019, it was announced that Kaufusi had been released by the club.

2020-21
On 6 February, Kaufusi signed a one-year deal with the Townsville Blackhawks. On 19 February, the Blackhawks announced that Kaufusi had ruptured his achilles tendon in training, ruling him out for five to six months. In March 2021, Kaufusi finally played his first game for Townsville.

Statistics

NRL

International

Personal life
Kaufusi is the younger brother of former Australian and Queensland representative Antonio and current Melbourne Storm player Felise.

References

External links
St. George Illawarra Dragons profile

1994 births
Living people
Melbourne Storm players
New Zealand rugby league players
New Zealand sportspeople of Tongan descent
New Zealand people of Niuean descent
New Zealand emigrants to Australia
North Queensland Cowboys players
Northern Pride RLFC players
Rugby league players from Auckland
Rugby league props
St. George Illawarra Dragons players
Tonga national rugby league team players